La Banda della Comasina ("Gang of Comasina") is the name which the Italian media used to describe a criminal group active in the 1970s in robberies, kidnappings and weapons trafficking in the northern area of Milan: the Comasina.
The area of action included the control of entire neighborhoods in Milan, with the presence of roadblocks controlled by the gang's members in which policemen were robbed and mocked.

Controlled by Renato Vallanzasca, it was often at odds with the band of Francis Turatello, active throughout Milan and head of many trades. Along with Vallanzasca, the most famous members of the band were: Antonio Colia, Rossano Cochis, Vito Pesce, Claudio Gatti, Carlo Carluccio and Antonio Furiato, the latter two died in gunfights with policemen, respectively, at Piazza Vetra in Milan, during a site inspection before a robbery and at the motorway A4 exit of Dalmine, while the gang was going to kidnap a businessman from Bergamo.

The group's most famous criminal action is the seizure of Emanuela Trapani, age 16, who was daughter of a businessman from Milan. The history of the Banda della Comasina is told in the book Il fiore del male (The Flower of Evil), written by Renato Vallanzasca.
Other members of the gang were: Massimo Malinverni, Pino Cobianchi, Michele Giglio, Franco Careccia, Santino Stefanini, Andrea Villa, Salvatore Paglia, Osvaldo Monopoli, Enrico Merlo, Claudio Basanisi, Silvio Zanetti, Antonio Rossi, Vincenzo Di Palma, Massimo Loi, Giuseppe Valfrè, Riccardo Bocchio, Giorgio Monaci, Marco Chiuri, Gian Ambrogio Castiglioni, Giovanni Riva, Salvatore Franco, Giorgio Uraci, Pietro Putignano, Salvatore Rosano, Gianfranco Casagrande.

Data protection laws 

Due to a request under data protection laws of Europe, Google is no longer able to show the Italian Wikipedia article for the subject on search results visible in Europe. However, when searching for the title, the Wikipedia article is still listed.

References

1970s establishments in Italy
1987 disestablishments in Italy
Organised crime groups in Italy